General Eduardo Fortes "Ed" Orpilla (Retired) (born January 2, 1948; Agoo, La Union) is a former Philippine National Police officer and businessman who previously run for the Senate under the Kilusang Bagong Lipunan in 2007 and currently married to Evelyn Refuerzo.

External links
GMA NEWS Profile

1948 births
Living people
Kilusang Bagong Lipunan politicians
Filipino police officers
People from La Union
21st-century Filipino businesspeople